María Portillo Cruz (born April 10, 1972 in Apurímac) is a Peruvian marathon runner. Portillo made her official debut for the 2000 Summer Olympics in Sydney, where she placed thirty-second out of fifty-four runners in the women's marathon, with a time of 2:36:50.

Eight years after competing in her last Olympics, Portillo qualified for the second time, as a 36-year-old, in the women's marathon at the 2008 Summer Olympics in Beijing. She finished the race in thirty-ninth place by two seconds behind Germany's Melanie Kraus, with a national record and a personal best time of 2:35:19.

References

External links

NBC 2008 Olympics profile

Peruvian female marathon runners
Living people
Olympic athletes of Peru
Athletes (track and field) at the 2000 Summer Olympics
Athletes (track and field) at the 2008 Summer Olympics
1972 births